The 1925 East Tennessee State Teachers football team was an American football team that represented East Tennessee State Teacher's College—now known as East Tennessee State University (ETSU)—as an independent in the 1925 college football season. It was the first year the school was known as East Tennessee State Teacher's College. They were led by first-year coach John Robinson, a World War I veteran and a University of Tennessee graduate, who also taught agriculture and coached the other male sports squads. He was referred to affectionately as "Robbie" and was so popular that later the 1929 yearbook was dedicated to him. The 1925 season was the first that the team was officially referred to as the "Teachers". It was recognized as one of the most successful in the fledgling program's history as they went 3–4 entirely against college-level competition, and 19 of 38 the male students came out for the team.

Schedule

References

East Tennessee State Teachers
East Tennessee State Buccaneers football seasons
East Tennessee State Teachers football